Rhythm of the Wave is a Taiwanese film spoken in Mandarin, first released in 1974 by Cine Art Film Company.

Cast
 Josephine Siao
 Chin Han
 Jenny Hu
 Ko Chun-hsiung

Crew
 Ho Yu-ye, executive producer
 Li Hsing, director
 Chang Yung-hsiang, script

Soundtrack
Hai yun is a soundtrack album, released in 1974 by Lee Fung Records. Unless otherwise, tracks are sung in the film by Teresa Teng, music was arranged by Lin Chia-ching, lyrics were written by Chuang Nu, and songs were composed by Ku Yue.

Side A
 "Hai yun" – main theme
 Re-recorded by Polydor Records for the 1977 compilation Greatest Hits by Teresa Teng
 "Remember You, Remember Me" ( "Jide ni jide wo") – sub-theme
 "Hey! I Tell You" ( "Hai! Wo gaosu ni") – sub-theme
 "Warmth" ( "Wennuan"), sung by Yuanye Sanchong Chang
 sub-theme of the 1974 film Where the Seagull Flies
 "First Love (keyboard instrumental)" ( "Chulian–dianziqin yanzou")

Side B
 "Hey! I Tell You" ( "Hai! Wo gaosu ni") – sub-theme, rendered by Wan Sha-lang
 "Three Dreams" ( "San ge meng") – sub-theme
 "First Love" – sub-theme, sung by Yuanye Sanchong Chang
 "Cherish the Flowers" – sub-theme
 "Hai yun (violin instrumental)" ( "Hai yun–xiaotiqin yanzou")

External links 
 Rhythm of the Wave at Lee Hsing exhibitions
 
 

1974 films
Taiwanese romance films
1970s Mandarin-language films
Films directed by Li Hsing
Films with screenplays by Chang Yung-hsiang